Betula schmidtii, the iron birch or Schmidt's birch, is a species of flowering plant in the family Betulaceae. It is native to Manchuria, Korea, Primorsky Krai of the Russian Far East, and Japan. A tree reaching  with nearly black bark, its wood is so dense that it does not float, and is used where a tough, durable material is desired.

References

schmidtii
Flora of Manchuria
Flora of Korea
Flora of Primorsky Krai
Flora of Japan
Plants described in 1865